St Brendan's GAA is a Gaelic Athletic Association group team based in east County Waterford, Ireland. The group team comprises the clubs, Kill, Bonmahon and Newtown.

As a group team, the team only competes in the Waterford Senior Football Championship.  The group team has of yet not won the championship.

Gaelic games clubs in County Waterford
Gaelic football clubs in County Waterford